Silvio Fernández (born 21 April 1946) is a Venezuelan fencer. He competed in the individual and team foil and individual épée events at the 1968 Summer Olympics.

References

External links
 

1946 births
Living people
Venezuelan male épée fencers
Olympic fencers of Venezuela
Fencers at the 1968 Summer Olympics
Sportspeople from Caracas
Pan American Games medalists in fencing
Pan American Games silver medalists for Venezuela
Pan American Games bronze medalists for Venezuela
Fencers at the 1967 Pan American Games
Fencers at the 1971 Pan American Games
Venezuelan male foil fencers
20th-century Venezuelan people
21st-century Venezuelan people